José Manuel may refer to:

 José Manuel (given name)
 José Manuel (footballer, born 1973), José Manuel Colmenero Crespo, Spanish football right midfielder
 José Manuel (footballer, born 2003), José Manuel Nicolás Ayén, Spanish football midfielder

See also